Rajakesari (Tamil:இராஜகேசரி), meaning "A lion among Kings", is a Tamil language historical novel written by Gokul Seshadri.  It is set in Tamil Nadu during the Chola dynasty. Rajakesari is the first part of a trilogy which also includes Cherar Kottai and Udhayabanu Karmegam.

Premise
The story is set around 1000 CE in the Chola capital city of Thanjavur, where emperor Rajaraja Chola's birthday is being celebrated. In the lands ruled by the Chera dynasty, another of the three main powers of the region, there are plots against the emperor, and agents have come to Thanjavur to attack him.

The Rajarajeswarm temple (present-day Brahadishwara Temple), which was commissioned by the king about a year earlier, is being built outside the city. The chief administrative officer of the project is called Adittan Suriyan. In addition to the engineers, sculptors, and other people involved in the construction and building, there is a group of 400 dancers (Thalippendugal) from other temples across the empire, who have been relocated to Thanjavur to work in the new temple. A dance drama troupe led by Vijayaraja Acharya, whose family belongs to a prestigious school of theatre artists, is rehearsing a new dance drama titled "Sri Rajaraja Vijayam" (the visit of Rajaraja). The theme of this drama is purportedly inspired by the life of the emperor himself.

A retired soldier from a village in the Chola countryside, witnesses a murder and travels to Thanjavur to seek justice. He becomes involved in the political machinations in the capital.

Characters
 Emperor Rajaraja Chola (Historical)
 Chola Army Commander [Senapathi] Rajaraja Marayar (Historical)
 Chief Minister Amangudi Krishnan Raman (Historical)
 Chola Army General Paraman Malapadiyar (Historical)
 Administrative Officer Adittan Suryan Tennavan Moovenda Velar (Historical)
 Commanding officer of the Bodyguards [Tirumeikappu] Velan Atkonda Villiyar (Fictional)
 War Veteran Ambalavanar Kamban Arayan (Fictional)
 Doctor Kilayoor Vathiyar (Fictional)
 Theatre master Santhik Koothar Vijayaraja Acharya (Fictional)
 Theatre artist Arikanda Devan (Fictional)
 Dancer Talaikkoli Nakkan Maduravasaki (Historical)

Publication history
The story was originally serialized in Varalaaru.com, a monthly web magazine, starting in 2004. It was published as a book by Palaniappa Brothers in 2008. In 2017, the author revised its contents and published a second edition.

In 2020, an audiobook version of Rajakesari] was published by StoryTel India, narrated by Deepika Arun.

References

Tamil-language literature
Novels set in the Chola Empire
Indian historical novels
Indian historical novels in Tamil